The discography of The Kooks, a British indie rock band, contains six studio albums, eight extended plays (EPs), thirty singles and twenty-five music videos.

Albums

Studio albums

Compilation albums

Remix albums

Extended plays

Singles

Other certified songs

Music videos

Other appearances

Notes

References

External links 
 The Kooks – official website
 

Discographies of British artists